James Vernon Camp (August 8, 1924 – January 31, 2002) was an American football player and coach.  He served as the head football coach at George Washington University from 1961 to 1966, compiling a record of 23–34.  A native of Danville, Virginia, Camp played college football
at Randolph–Macon College in 1942 and at the University of North Carolina at Chapel Hill from 1944 to 1947.  He played professionally for one season, in 1948, with the Brooklyn Dodgers of the All-America Football Conference  (AAFC).

Head coaching record

References

External links
 
 

1924 births
2002 deaths
American football quarterbacks
Brooklyn Dodgers (AAFC) players
George Washington Colonials football coaches
Minnesota Golden Gophers football coaches
North Carolina Tar Heels football players
North Carolina Tar Heels football coaches
Mississippi State Bulldogs football coaches
UCLA Bruins football coaches
People from Danville, Virginia
People from Union, South Carolina
Coaches of American football from Virginia
Players of American football from Virginia